Zanita Ahmed Zhilik simply known as Zhilik is a Bangladeshi singer. She works in many music albums and singles with many well known artists. She was champion of channel-i musical reality show Shera Kontho in 2008.

Early life 
Zhilik was born in Rangpur. Her family was culturally oriented. She have started learning music from her father. Her father was an enlisted singer of Bangladesh TV and radio.

Discography

References

External links 

21st-century Bangladeshi women singers
21st-century Bangladeshi singers
Living people
People from Rangpur District
Year of birth missing (living people)